Eva Alexandra Ingrid Irmgard Anna Högl (Kampmeyer; born 6 January 1969) is a German politician of the Social Democratic Party (SPD) who has been serving as Parliamentary Commissioner for the Armed Forces of Germany since May 2020.

Högl previously served as a member of the Bundestag, the German parliament, from 2009 until 2020. From 2013 until 2020, she served as deputy chairwoman of the SPD parliamentary group. She has been a member of her party since 1987.

Early career 
Högl was born in Osnabrück. From 1999 until 2009, she worked at the Federal Ministry of Labour and Social Affairs (BMAS) in Berlin. At the ministry, she was head of the unit in charge of European labor and social policy between 2006 and 2009.

Political career

Career in state politics 

Since 2007, Högl has been a member of the executive board of the SPD in Berlin, under the leadership of party chairman Michael Müller. Before the 2008 elections in Lower Saxony, candidate Wolfgang Jüttner included Högl in his shadow cabinet for the Social Democrats' – unsuccessful – campaign to unseat incumbent Minister-President Christian Wulff. During the campaign, she served as shadow minister for regional development and European affairs.

Member of Parliament, 2009–2020 
Högl was elected to the German Bundestag in 2009, representing the constituency of Berlin-Mitte. In her first full legislative term from 2009 until 2013, she was a member of the Committee on Legal Affairs and the Committee on European Affairs. On the latter committee, she was her parliamentary group's rapporteur on the 2010 European Union directive on the rights to interpretation and to translation in criminal proceedings. In addition to her committee assignments, she served as deputy chairwoman of the German-Dutch Parliamentary Friendship Group from 2010 until 2013. Within the SPD parliamentary group, she was a member of the working group on municipal policy from 2009 until 2017.

In the negotiations to form a Grand Coalition of Chancellor Angela Merkel's Christian Democrats (CDU together with the Bavarian CSU) and the SPD following the 2013 federal elections, Högl was part of the SPD delegation in the working group on families, women and equality, led by Annette Widmann-Mauz and Manuela Schwesig.

From December 2013 until May 2020, Högl served as deputy chairwoman of the SPD parliamentary group under the leadership of successive chairpersons Thomas Oppermann (2013–2017), Andrea Nahles (2017–2019) and Rolf Mützenich (2019–2020). In addition, she was appointed to the Committee on the Election of Judges (Wahlausschuss), which is in charge of appointing judges to the Federal Constitutional Court of Germany. She also served on the parliamentary body in charge of appointing judges to the Highest Courts of Justice, namely the Federal Court of Justice (BGH), the Federal Administrative Court (BVerwG), the Federal Fiscal Court (BFH), the Federal Labour Court (BAG), and the Federal Social Court (BSG). In 2019, she joined the Parliamentary Oversight Panel (PKGr), which provides parliamentary oversight of Germany's intelligence services BND, BfV and MAD.

In the negotiations to form a fourth coalition government under Merkel following the 2017 federal elections, Högl was part of the working group on migration and integration, led by Volker Bouffier, Joachim Herrmann and Ralf Stegner.

Parliamentary Commissioner for the Armed Forces, 2020–present 
In May 2020 Högl was appointed Parliamentary Commissioner for the Armed Forces of Germany and gave up her seat in the Bundestag. Her seat was taken up by Mechthild Rawert.

Other activities

Corporate boards 
 Berliner Stadtreinigung (BSR), Member of the Advisory Board

Non-profit organizations 
 Leo Baeck Foundation, Member of the Board of Trustees (since 2022)
 Psychologische Hochschule Berlin (PHB), Member of the Board of Trustees
 German-Arab Friendship Association (DAFG), Member of the Advisory Board
 Europäische Akademie für Frauen in Politik und Wirtschaft Berlin, Member of the Board of Trustees
 Friedrich Ebert Foundation (FES), Member
 Conciliation Board of the Federal Bar Association, Member of the Advisory Board
 Willy Brandt Center Jerusalem, Member
 German Foundation for International Legal Cooperation (IRZ), Member (since 2014)
 Gegen Vergessen – Für Demokratie, Member
 Europa-Union Deutschland, Member
 German United Services Trade Union (ver.di), Member
 Pro Asyl, Member
 Transparency International, Member
 Memorial to the Murdered Jews of Europe Foundation, Member of the Board of Trustees (-2020)

Political positions 
Högl has been a vocal proponent of banning the extreme rightwing National Democratic Party of Germany (NPD), arguing that a ban would "hit the party as an organisation and also stop it being financed by taxpayers".

Högl has also demanded improved voting rights for foreigners living in Germany.

Personal life 
Högl is married to an architect. The couple resides in Berlin's Wedding district, in the same building as Peer Steinbrück.

References 

Living people
1969 births
Military Ombudspersons in Germany
Members of the Bundestag for Berlin
Female members of the Bundestag
Politicians from Osnabrück
Osnabrück University alumni
Leiden University alumni
Members of the Bundestag 2017–2021
Members of the Bundestag 2013–2017
Members of the Bundestag 2009–2013
Members of the Bundestag for the Social Democratic Party of Germany
21st-century German women politicians